Gary Bernard Stewart Yershon (born 2 November 1954) is an English composer. His works include music for theatre, radio, television, film, and dance. He is an Associate Artist of the Royal Shakespeare Company.

Born in London, he began his career as an actor. He worked as writer/translator (e.g. Ruslan and Lyudmila for the BBC, and as musical director for Phyllida Lloyd's 1994 production of The Threepenny Opera at the Donmar Warehouse.

He composed the music for Mike Leigh's 2008 film Happy-Go-Lucky, 2010 film  Another Year, 2014 film Mr. Turner and 2018 film Peterloo. He wrote the theme tune and incidental music to the children's television series James the Cat.

Yershon was nominated for the 2009 Drama Desk Award for Outstanding Music in a Play.

In 2010 he was nominated for a European Film Award for his work on Another Year. In 2015 for the 87th Academy Awards, he received a nomination for the Academy Award for Best Original Score for his work on Mr. Turner.

References

External links
 

1954 births
English film score composers
English male film score composers
Living people
Musicians from London